The 1989 Bologna Open was a men's tennis tournament played on outdoor clay courts at the Cierrebi Club in Bologna, Italy that was part of the 1989 Nabisco Grand Prix circuit. It was the fifth edition of the tournament and was played from 12 June until 18 June 1989. Sixth-seeded Javier Sánchez won the singles title.

Finals

Singles

 Javier Sánchez defeated  Franco Davín 6–1, 6–0
 It was Sánchez' 1st singles title of the year and the 2nd of his career.

Doubles

 Sergio Casal /  Javier Sánchez defeated  Tomas Nydahl /  Jörgen Windahl 6–2, 6–3

References

External links
 ITF tournament edition details

Bologna Outdoor
Bologna
1989 in Italian tennis